Oenopia conglobata is a species of ladybird (Coccinellidae) native to continental Europe, Asia and Africa. Its colloquial names in Germany are 'poplar ladybird' and Kugelige ('spherical', or perhaps 'bullet') ladybird.

Description

The adult beetles are 3.5 to 5 mm long and have oval, slightly curved bodies. The elytra are light pink or pale yellow with a black seam, bearing eight square black spots varying in size and sometimes flowing into each other. There are also completely black colored specimens. The pronotum is light beige and bears seven black, symmetrically arranged spots. The head is black and white. The antennae are yellow, but slightly darker coloured at the end; the legs are yellow brown.

Occurrence

Oenopia conglobata is found in Europe except in the North, North Africa and the temperate regions of Asia, but absent from the British Isles and the Northwest. The species lives in mixed forests of the lower altitudes, being found mainly on poplar, pine, larch, and Prunus species such as bird cherries.

Diet

Like most types of ladybirds the adults and larvae of Oenopia conglobata eat aphids.

Habits

The beetles overwinter under the bark of trees, mostly poplars, elms, plane, oak and horse chestnut. The species is also found nesting between the panes of double-glazed windows.

Literature

 Harde, Severa: Der Kosmos Käferführer, Die mitteleuropäischen Käfer, Franckh-Kosmos Verlags-GmbH & Co, Stuttgart 2000, 
 Jiři Zahradnik, Irmgard Jung, Dieter Jung et al.: Käfer Mittel- und Nordwesteuropas. Parey, Berlin 1985, 

Coccinellidae
Beetles described in 1758
Taxa named by Carl Linnaeus